Lake Placid: Legacy is a 2018 American-South African made-for-television horror film directed by Darrell Roodt and stars Katherine Barrell, Tim Rozon, Sai Bennett and Joe Pantoliano. It premiered on Syfy on May 28, 2018 and is the sixth installment in the Lake Placid film series. The film has its own story that tells the origin of how the crocodiles got to be in Lake Placid.

Plot 
A group of activists consisting of Jade, her younger sister Alice, Jade's boyfriend Sam, hacker Billy, and their friend Spencer, are challenged by Sam's ex-friend Dane over a video to travel to an island in the middle of a lake that harbors an old research facility. The group travels to the island on boat with rangers Pennie, and Travis, and begin exploring. They soon find the dead body of Dane's friend Gomez in a tree, as well as Dane's camera, which depicts him being attacked by something. In the video, he talks of a man named Henderson who supposedly abandoned him. Spencer believes that it is a hoax. The group attempts to leave, although something causes the boat to drift onto the lake with Travis on it, and Pennie is dragged into the water by a rope. When Travis attempts to save her, he's eaten by the creature, leaving Sam to save her, and the group is left stranded on the island. The incident leaves Pennie with an injured leg.

The remaining survivors find, and enter the facility, and are forced to climb down into another section of the facility using a rope. When the creature, revealed to be a 50-foot crocodile, arrives, Jade, Sam, and Alice become separated from Billy, Spencer, and Pennie in the facility. As Jade, Sam, and Alice explore the facility, Billy goes down to a dock to reach an electrical outlet in order to make a phone call to the police. However, he quickly loses the signal, and Spencer is pulled into the water and killed by the crocodile. Pennie forces Billy to reach the others while she stays behind to fight the crocodile. The crocodile follows Pennie into a tunnel where it quickly kills her.

Jade, Sam, and Alice soon find Dane alive in the facility, and he shows them to Henderson, who is a man who used to work at the facility. He was part of an experiment to weaponize crocodiles, and notes that when the program was shut down, one of the crocodile's caregivers took a few juveniles away to Black Lake in Maine where the rest of the series had taken place. He introduced Dane and Gomez to the facility, and used them as a way to get back into the facility to continue the experiments. Meanwhile, Billy reaches another building, and manages to contact the other survivors, although he's soon killed when the crocodile breaks in. Henderson escapes in the chaos and Jade, Sam, Alice, and Dane make an attempt to escape. Henderson attempts to trap the group in the facility by flooding it, although they manage to swim through the flood, and escape into another section of the facility.

The crocodile soon catches up to the group and eats Dane, before killing Henderson, who was making an attempt to capture it. Jade, Sam, and Alice find a room with several gas cans, and Sam creates a plan to kill the crocodile by blowing up the gas cans. He begins releasing the gas and has Jade, and Alice escape while he stays behind to kill it. The crocodile enters, and he attempts to ignite the gas with a flare, although the flare shorts out, allowing the crocodile to eat him. The crocodile chases Jade and Alice in the woods and eventually corners Alice and attempts to eat her, although Jade traps it with an excavator before igniting the excavator’s fuel with a lighter, killing it. Jade and Alice begin swimming back to the mainland, only for a second crocodile to be revealed in the water unbeknownst to them.

Cast
 Katherine Barrell as Jade
 Tim Rozon as Sam
 Sai Bennett as Alice 
 Luke Newton as Billy
 Craig Stein as Spencer
 Greg Kriek as Travis
 Joe Pantoliano as Henderson
 Alisha Bailey as Pennie 
 Maxim Baldry as Dane 
 Gavin Lee Gomes as Gomez

Production 
The film was shot in South Africa in December 2017.

Home media 
Lake Placid: Legacy was released on DVD and digital on September 4, 2018.

See also 
 List of killer crocodile films

References

External links 
 

2018 television films
2018 horror films
American natural horror films
Films about crocodilians
Films set in Maine
Films shot in South Africa
Giant monster films
Lake Placid (film series)
Syfy original films
Direct-to-video sequel films
Sony Pictures direct-to-video films
Television sequel films
Reboot films
American horror television films
2018 films
2010s American films